Novobaltachevo (Yañı Baltas) is a rural locality (a village) in Toshkurovsky Selsoviet, Baltachevsky District, Bashkortostan, Russia. The population was 337 as of 2010. There are 7 streets.

Geography 
Novobaltachevo is located 10 km northeast of Starobaltachevo (the district's administrative centre) by road. Tuktayevo is the nearest rural locality.

References 

Rural localities in Baltachevsky District